Taupō (before 2008 spelled Taupo with no macron) is a New Zealand parliamentary electorate returning one Member of Parliament to the House of Representatives. Taupo first existed between 1963 and 1981, and was recreated for the introduction of MMP in 1996. The current MP for Taupō is Louise Upston of the National Party. She has held this position since 2008.

Electorate profile
The Taupō electorate is based on the central North Island communities around Lake Taupō and the South Waikato District, including Tūrangi, Taupō, Tokoroa, and Cambridge.

In 2013, one quarter (24.9%) of people in the Taupō electorate belonged to the Māori ethnic group – the sixth-highest share in New Zealand. The proportions of those working in the electricity, gas, water and waste services industry (1.3%), the accommodation, cafe, and restaurant industry (7.5%), and in arts and recreation services (2.4%), were well above the national average.

History
The Taupo electorate was first created for the 1963 election and it existed until 1981. The former electorate was much smaller than the current one, since it did not contain the western side of Lake Taupo, nor Cambridge, nor the Ruapehu towns. It was a marginal seat and frequently changed between National and Labour.

The current Taupō electorate was created ahead of the introduction to mixed-member proportional (MMP) voting in 1996. It is a merger of the old marginal seat of Tongariro with the western half of the safe National seat of Waikaremoana. Prior to the 2008 election, the electorate pulled south to take in the northern and western parts of Ruapehu District.

In the 2007 redistribution conducted after the 2006 census, the northern and western parts of Ruapehu District containing Taumarunui, Raetihi and Ohakune were assigned to Rangitīkei. At the same time, low population growth in the south-central North Island coupled with high population growth in and around Auckland has meant Cambridge moved out of the now defunct  electorate and into Taupō. No boundary adjustments were undertaken in the subsequent 2013/14 redistribution.

Taupō has twice returned Mark Burton with a majority of around a thousand – in 1996, when Labour's post-1990 fortunes were at their lowest and New Zealand First went on to take a large bite out of their vote; and again in 2005, when National consolidated the centre-right vote, and at the same time won 2,000 more party votes than Burton's Labour party. At the intermediate two MMP elections, Burton was safely returned, thanks in part to a heavy disenchantment with the National Party among its formerly loyal voters. In the political climate in 2008, with the dominance of the National Party in Cambridge, which contributed over ten thousand new voters to the seat, Louise Upston won the seat with a majority of over 6,000.

Members of Parliament
Unless otherwise stated, all MPs' terms began and ended at general elections.

Key
  

As of  no candidates that have contested the Taupō electorate have been returned as list MPs.

Election results

2020 election

2017 election

2014 election

2011 election

Electorate (as at 26 November 2011): 45,800

2008 election

2005 election

2002 election

 
 
 
 
 
 
 

a United Future swing is compared to the 1999 results of United NZ and Future NZ, who merged in 2000.

1999 election

1981 election

 
 
 
 
 
 

Result as declared by the High Court after an electoral petition.

1978 election

1975 election

1972 election

1969 election

1966 election

 
 
 
 
 
 

In 1966 National, afraid the seat would go to Labour, poured thousands of dollars into the local campaign. A hundred women from all over Waikato canvassed every house in Tokoroa and Putāruru over two days, using the street lists and blue dot system. The seat was held by 258 votes.

1963 election

Notes

References

External links
Electorate Profile  Parliamentary Library

New Zealand electorates
Taupō District
1963 establishments in New Zealand
1984 disestablishments in New Zealand
1996 establishments in New Zealand